"It's You That I Need" is a hit song by Detroit R&B vocal group Enchantment, and was their most successful song.  Released from their 1977 LP, Once Upon A Dream, it spent a week at number one on the Hot Soul Singles chart in February 1978 and peaked at number thirty-three on the Billboard Hot 100

Chart positions

References

1977 songs
1978 singles
Enchantment (band) songs
Songs written by Michael Stokes (record producer)
United Artists Records singles